The following is a list of the ports in Spain declared to be of "general interest" and thus, under the exclusive competence of the General Administration of the State. They are operated by 28 different port authorities, which are coordinated in turn by Puertos del Estado, a State-owned company.

Notes

References

See also 
 Puertos (national entity)
 List of airports in Spain
 Transport in Spain

External links 
Spanish Ports

 
Spain
Ports
Ports

